Coniolo is a comune (municipality) in the Province of Alessandria in the Italian region Piedmont, located about  east of Turin and about  northwest of Alessandria.

Coniolo closest neighbours are: 
 to the south and east: Casale Monferrato
 to the north: Morano sul Po
 to the west: Pontestura.

Demographic evolution

References

Cities and towns in Piedmont